The Nature Coast State Trail (NCST) is a 31.7-mile long segment of Florida's Statewide System of Greenways and Trails System built along abandoned railroad tracks, and designated by the U.S. Department of the Interior as a National Recreation Trail.  It has two primary sections following unused rail lines that were originally built by the Atlantic Coast Line Railroad. It includes historic sites such as an old train trestle bridge over the Suwannee River near Old Town and train stations in Trenton, Cross City, and Chiefland.  At Wilcox Junction abandoned rail tracks cross and  connect with several communities. The trail is available to hikers, cyclists, and horse riders.

History
Florida has many abandoned railway tracks in the Suwannee River Valley. In the early 1900s freight and passenger steamships were replaced by trains that carried crops and timber and also made passenger stops in small towns such as Chiefland, Cross City, and Trenton. The Nature Coast Trail follows this historic route. The 31.7 miles of the Nature Coast State Trail connects several counties and five communities (Cross City, Trenton, Fanning Springs Old Town and Chiefland).

In 2010, then-Florida governor Charlie Crist approved the purchase a 9.33-mile corridor, known as the Trenton-Newberry Rail Trail. This will extend the 31.7-mile NCST managed by the Florida Department of Environmental Protection.

Nearby land and water resources exist in the vicinity of the Nature Coast State Trail.
 Suwannee River
 Fanning Springs
 Big Bend Seagrasses Aquatic Preserve
 Manatee Springs State Park
 "City of Hawkinsville" Underwater Archaeological Preserve
 Andrews Wildlife Management Area
 Cedar Key Scrub State Reserve
 Waccasassa Bay State Preserve
 Cedar Keys National Wildlife Refuge
 Lower Suwannee National Wildlife Refuge
 Jena Wildlife Management Area
 Gulf Hammock Wildlife Management Area
 Goethe State Forest
 Fanning Springs State Recreation Area
 Andrews Wildlife Management Area
 Suwannee River Wilderness Trail
 Withlacoochee State Trail

References

External links
Nature Coast state bike trail
Railway line may become part of the trail Lakeland Ledger - May 31, 2004
Newberry railroad bed may become rails-to-trails path - Gainesville Sun - Feb 11, 2005
 Nature Coast State Trail at 100 Florida Trails

Rail trails in Florida
Bike paths in Florida
National Recreation Trails in Florida